The LFU 205 is a single-engined, four-seat, low-wing monoplane, that was built in the late 1960s entirely from glass reinforced plastic.

Design and development

The Leichflugtechnik-Union (LFU) was a consortium formed by the Bölkow, Pützer and Rhein-Flugzeugbau companies specifically to produce an aircraft built entirely of glass reinforced plastic (grp).  The result, the LFU 205 was one of the first all-grp light aircraft.

The LFU 205 is a single-engined, low-winged monoplane of conventional appearance apart from slight, 7° forward sweep on the moderately tapered wing.  This carries Fowler flaps along the whole trailing edge inboard of the Frise ailerons.  The tail surfaces are also straight tapered, with the vertical surfaces slightly swept. The tailplane is a single piece, all moving surface. There are two pairs of side by side seats under a large curved, rearward sliding, canopy.  Fuselage and flying surfaces are monocoque structures using a grp sandwich with a smooth outer surface bonded to a corrugated inner skin, the latter formed from parallel 10 mm (0.4 in) tubes wrapped in glass fibre.  The corrugations run chordwise, rib-like, in the wings and tail and circumferentially in the fuselage.  The tail structures have a foam plastic core.

It is powered by a flat 4-cylinder, 200 hp (150 kW) Lycoming IO-360 engine and has a tricycle undercarriage with inward retracting main legs and an aft retracting nosewheel.  The first flight was on 29 March 1968.

Operational history

The LFU 205 was intended as an experimental aircraft and only one was built.  The initial flying programme was to test the constructional methods.  Since 1984 it has flown with the German Aerospace Centre (DLR) at Brunswick, Germany. It has been used in a research program into laminar flow aerofoils by fitting a "glove" of the new profile over the wings of the LFU 205 in the central sections inboard of the ailerons on both sides.  One prime interest is in the transition region between laminar and turbulent flow, studied using infra-red imaging.  The gloved regions are also instrumented to gain data on pressure and drag distributions and boundary layer behaviour.

Aircraft on display
 Deutsches Museum Flugwerft Schleissheim - sole example

Specifications

References

External links

1960s German civil utility aircraft
1960s German experimental aircraft
205
Single-engined tractor aircraft
Forward-swept-wing aircraft
Low-wing aircraft
Aircraft first flown in 1968